Ida Marie Bjørgul (born 1988) is a Norwegian orienteering competitor, born in Halden and residing in Turku, Finland.

She represented her country at two Junior World Orienteering Championships. She received a silver medal in the middle distance at the 2007 Junior World Orienteering Championships in Dubbo. In Gothenburg in 2008 she finished 12th in sprint, 16th in the middle, and 11th in the long course.

She competed at the 2012 World Orienteering Championships. In the middle distance she qualified for the final, where she placed 30th. She also competed at the 2015, 2016 and 2017 World Orienteering Championships.

References

External links

1988 births
Living people
People from Halden
Norwegian orienteers
Female orienteers
Foot orienteers
Norwegian expatriate sportspeople in Finland
Competitors at the 2017 World Games
Sportspeople from Viken (county)
Junior World Orienteering Championships medalists